Little Inagua is a small remote island in the Bahamas. It is the largest uninhabited island in the Caribbean. The island remains in an undisturbed and natural state.

In 2002, it became part of Little Inagua National Park.

See also 
Inagua
List of islands of The Bahamas

References

Uninhabited islands of the Bahamas
Inagua